Cliff Davidson (born January 7, 1941) is an American politician who served in the Alaska House of Representatives from 1987 to 1995.

References

1941 births
Living people
Democratic Party members of the Alaska House of Representatives